Leopoldo Giovanni Giuseppe Michele of Bourbon-Two Sicilies, Prince of Salerno (2 July 1790 – 10 March 1851) was a member of the House of Bourbon-Two Sicilies and a Prince of Bourbon-Two Sicilies. He married Archduchess Clementina of Austria in 1816, and became the Prince of Salerno.

Biography

Born Leopoldo of Naples and Sicily, he was the sixth son of Ferdinand IV of Naples and his wife Maria Carolina of Austria, daughter of Maria Theresa of Austria.

Marriage and issue 
Leopold married his niece Archduchess Clementina of Austria, third surviving daughter of Francis II, Holy Roman Emperor (later Francis I of Austria) and his sister Maria Teresa of Naples and Sicily on 28 July 1816 at Schönbrunn Palace in Vienna. Leopold and Clementina had four children but only their daughter Princess Maria Carolina survived infancy. Prince Louis and two infants died within their first year.

 Stillborn daughter* (16 September 1819)
 Princess Maria Carolina (26 April 1822 – 6 December 1869); married, on 25 November 1844, Prince Henri, Duke of Aumale. Had issue.
 Prince Lodovico Carlos (19 July – 7 August 1824)
 Stillborn daughter* (5 February 1829)

Leopold also had an extramarital affair with the Viennese dancer Fanny Elssler, which led to the birth of an illegitimate son, Franz, born in 1827 and died by suicide in 1873.

Death 
Leopold died at the age of sixty, on 10 March 1851 in Naples. His wife, Clementina, died thirty years later, at the age of eighty-three.

Honours
Knight of the Order of Saint Januarius (1790)
Knight Grand Cross of Justice of the Sacred Military Constantinian Order of Saint George (1797)
Knight of the Spanish Order of the Golden Fleece (1802)
Knight of the Orders of the King of France (1810)
Knight of the Order of Saint Ferdinand and of Merit
Knight of the Royal and Distinguished Spanish Order of Charles III
Knight of the Order of Saint George and Reunion
Knight of the Order of the Most Holy Annunciation (1822)

Ancestry

References

External links

1790 births
1851 deaths
18th-century Neapolitan people
Princes of Bourbon-Two Sicilies
Neapolitan princes
Sicilian princes
Princes of Salerno
Italian Roman Catholics
Knights of the Golden Fleece of Spain
Burials at the Basilica of Santa Chiara
People of the Napoleonic Wars
19th-century Neapolitan people
Sons of kings